Gaerwen is a village on the island of Anglesey in the community of Llanfihangel Ysgeifiog. The A5 runs through the village, and the A55 runs just a few hundred metres north. According to the 2011 Census Gaerwen is now listed by the Office for National Statistics as Llanfihangel Ysgeifiog. The population of the community is 1,551. Gaerwen and Pentre Berw, Llangaffo are trio villages.

The village gets its name from a combination of the Welsh words Caer (mutated to Gaer), meaning 'fortification', and Wen, meaning 'white'. There are no clear remains of a fort in the area, although the name was originally that of a farm in the area, before becoming the name for the entire settlement.

Gaerwen Hoard
An important Bronze Age hoard was found near Gaerwen in the nineteenth century. Comprising  2 gold lockrings and 2 penannular bracelets, it is now in the collections of the British Museum.

Attractions
Facilities in Gaerwen include two public houses, and four churches. There are two disused windmills in the north of the village and a modern industrial estate making up the south west portion.

There is a primary school and a football pitch in the middle of the village. There is also a fish and chip shop with a barber shop next door. A science park on the south of the A55 Junction was opened in 2018.

There is a war memorial at the heart of the village paying tribute to those who fell in both World Wars.

Governance
An electoral ward electoral of the same name as the Community exists. The population of this ward at the 2011 census was 2,016.

Rail lines
The village houses the southernmost station of the Anglesey Central Railway, which was in use between 1864 and 1993. It was also used on the Bangor to Holyhead mainline until 1963.

References

Photos of Gaerwen and surrounding area on geograph
Photos of Star and surrounding area on geograph
Isle of Anglesey County Council

Villages in Anglesey
Llanfihangel Ysgeifiog